Jubilo is a 1919 American comedy film directed by Clarence G. Badger and written by Robert F. Hill. The film stars Will Rogers, Josie Sedgwick, Charles K. French, Willard Louis, and James Mason. The film was released on December 7, 1919, by Goldwyn Pictures.

In 2021, the film was selected for preservation in the United States National Film Registry by the Library of Congress as being "culturally, historically, or aesthetically significant".

Plot

Cast       
Will Rogers as Jubilo
Josie Sedgwick as Rose Hardy
Charles K. French as Jim Handy 
Willard Louis as Punt
James Mason as Bert Rooker

References

External links

1910s English-language films
Silent American comedy films
1919 comedy films
Goldwyn Pictures films
Films directed by Clarence G. Badger
American silent feature films
American black-and-white films
United States National Film Registry films
1910s American films